The Lidui Park railway station is an underground railway station. The former name is Guanxian Ancient Town railway station. The railway station is on the Lidui Branch Line of Chengdu–Dujiangyan Intercity Railway in Dujiangyan, Chengdu, Sichuan, China. This railway station is 12192 square metres.

Destinations and Prices

Rolling Stock
China Railways CRH1A

See also
Chengdu–Dujiangyan Intercity Railway

References

Stations on the Chengdu–Dujiangyan Intercity Railway
Railway stations in China opened in 2013
Railway stations in Sichuan